The Economists' Hour: False Prophets, Free Markets, and the Fracture of Society is a book on economic history written by Binyamin Appelbaum and published by Little, Brown and Company in September 2019. The book "traces the rise of economists, first in the United States and then around the globe, as their ideas reshaped the modern world, curbing government, unleashing corporations and hastening globalization."

References

Economic history
2019 non-fiction books
Little, Brown and Company books